The Four Days of Naples (Italian: Quattro giornate di Napoli) was an uprising in Naples, Italy, against Nazi German occupation forces from September 27 to September 30, 1943, immediately prior to the arrival of Allied forces in Naples on October 1 during World War II.

The spontaneous uprising of Neapolitan and Italian Resistance against German occupying forces, despite limited armament, organisation or planning, nevertheless successfully disrupted German plans to deport Neapolitans en masse, destroy the city and prevent Allied forces from gaining a strategic foothold.

The city was subsequently awarded the Gold Medal of Military Valor. The four days are celebrated annually and were the subject of the 1962 film The Four Days of Naples.

Prelude

Historical background
From 1940 to 1943, Naples suffered heavy Allied bombing raids causing severe damage and heavy civilian population loss. It has been calculated that 20,000 civilian Neapolitans died in the indiscriminate attacks. Over 3,000 died in the raid of 4 August 1943 alone, and around 600 were killed and 3,000 injured by the explosion of the ship  in port on 28 March. The city's artistic and cultural heritage also suffered damage, including the partial destruction of the Chiesa di Santa Chiara on 4 December 1942. With the Allied advance in southern Italy, antifascists in the Naples area (including Fausto Nicolini, Claudio Ferri and Adolfo Omodeo) began establishing closer contacts with the Allied commanders and requested Naples's liberation.

From 8 September 1943, the day in which the Cassibile Armistice came into force, the Italian Army forces in the area (without orders, as were most of the units at the time) drifted toward Naples. There, the situation was already difficult thanks to the unceasing bombing raids and the imbalance in forces, with 20,000 Germans opposed to 5,000 Italians in the whole of Campania. The situation in Naples soon devolved into chaos, with many higher officials, either unable to take the initiative or even directly collaborating with the Nazis, deserting the city, followed by the Italian troops. Those escaping included Riccardo Pentimalli and Ettore Del Tetto, the generals entrusted with military responsibility for Naples, who fled in civilian clothing. Del Tetto's last actions before he fled had been to hand the city over to the German army and to publish a decree banning assemblies and authorising the military to fire on those disregarding the ban. Even so, sporadic but bloody attempts at resistance arose throughout the Zanzur Barracks, as far as the Carabinieri barracks at Pastrengo and at the 21st "Centro di Avvistamento" (Early Detection Post) of Castel dell'Ovo.

Turmoil

In the days following the armistice, episodes of intolerance and armed resistance against Naples's German occupiers intensified and were more or less organized, including on September 1, a student demonstration in Piazza del Plebiscito and the first meeting of the Liceo Sannazaro in Vomero.

On September 9, a group of citizens encountered German troops at Palazzo dei Telefoni and managed to escape to Via Santa Brigida. The latter episode involved a member of the Carabiniere, who opened fire to defend a shop from German soldiers attempting to loot it.

On 10 September, between Piazza del Plebiscito and the gardens below, the first bloody clash occurred, with the Neapolitans successfully blocking several German motor vehicles. In the fights, three German sailors and three German soldiers died. The occupiers managed to free some of those imprisoned by the rioters thanks to an injunction by an Italian official, who summoned his countrymen to surrender some of their hostages and all of their weapons. The retaliation for the Piazza del Plebiscito clashes came quickly, and the Germans set fire to the National Library and opened fire on the crowd that had gathered there.

On 12 September, numerous soldiers were killed on the streets of Naples, and about 4,000 Italian soldiers and civilians were deported for forced labor. An announcement on 22 September decreed compulsory labor for all men from 18 to 33 and set their forced deportation to work camps in northern Italy and Germany. Neapolitans refused, and, as men were rounded up and brought to the stadium in the Vomero, a civilian uprising ensued.

State of siege
The same day, Colonel Walter Schöll assumed command of the military occupiers in the city and declared a curfew and a state of siege, with orders to execute all those responsible for hostile actions against German troops and up to 100 Neapolitans for every German killed.

The following proclamations appeared on the walls of the city on 13 September:

The orders were followed by the shooting of eight prisoners of war in via Cesario Console, and a tank opened fire against students who were beginning to gather in the nearby university and several Italian sailors in front of the stock market.

A young sailor was executed on the stairs of the headquarters, and thousands of people were forced to attend by German troops. On the same day, 500 people were also forcibly deported to Teverola, near Caserta and forced to watch the execution of 14 policemen, who had offered armed resistance to the occupying forces.

Seeds of rebellion
Together, the war's indiscriminate executions, looting, control of the civilian population, increasing poverty and destruction, spurred a completely spontaneous rebellion in the city, without external organization.

22 September
On 22 September, inhabitants of the Vomero quarter were able to steal ammunition from an Italian artillery battery; on 25 September 250 rifles were stolen from a school; and on 27 September Neapolitan insurgents captured additional weapons and ammunition.

23 September
In the meantime, Colonel Schöll on 23 September ordered additional measures to suppress the population, including the evacuation (within 20 hours that same day) of the entire coastal area up  from the waterfront. Approximately 240,000 people would be forced to abandon their homes to allow the creation of a "military security zone", potentially a prelude to the port's destruction. Almost simultaneously, a manifesto  from the city's prefect called for compulsory work for all males between the ages of 18 and 30, in effect a forced deportation to labour camps in Germany. Only 150 Neapolitans out of the planned 30,000 responded to the call, which led Schöll to send soldiers into Naples to round up and immediately execute resisters.

26 September
In response, on September 26, an unarmed crowd poured into the streets, opposed the Nazi roundups and freed the resisters from deportation. The rioters were joined by former Italian soldiers who had thus far remained hidden.

Four days

27 September

On September 27, large numbers of German troops captured about 8,000 Neapolitans, and 400-500 armed rioters responded in attack.

One of the first outbreaks of fighting occurred in Vomero, where a group of armed men stopped a German car and killed the German NCO driver. The same day, fierce fighting followed in different areas of the city between the insurgents and German soldiers. The Germans began evacuating, spurred by news, later proved to be false, of an imminent Allied landing at Bagnoli.

An Italian lieutenant, Enzo Stimolo, led a group of 200 insurgents against a weapons depot at Castel Sant'Elmo, which was captured that evening, not without bloodshed, after German reinforcements arrived from the Villa Floridiana and the Campo Sportivo del Littorio areas.

Meanwhile, a group of citizens moved on the Parco di Capodimonte (the Capodimonte Park) in response to rumours that Germans were executing prisoners there. An insurgent plan to prevent German engineers from destroying the Ponte della Sanità (the Maddalena Cerasuolo bridge) and thereby isolating the city center was devised and carried out the following day.

That evening, insurgents attacked and plundered weapons armories in the barracks at Via Foria and Via San Giovanni a Carbonara.

28 September
On September 28, fighting increased with further Neapolitan citizens joining the riot. In Materdei, a German patrol, which had taken shelter in a civil building, was surrounded and kept under siege for hours until the arrival of reinforcements. In the end, three Neapolitans had died in the battle.

At Porta Capuana, a group of 40 men, armed with rifles and machine guns, set up a roadblock, killing six enemy soldiers and capturing four. Other fighting broke out in Maschio Angioino, Vasto and Monteoliveto.

Germans launched raids in Vomero and took prisoners inside the Campo Sportivo del Littorio, which prompted an assault on the sports field by a party led by Enzo Stimolo, which liberated prisoners the following day.

29 September
On the third day of the riot, the streets of Naples witnessed fierce clashes. As no connection could be established with national antifascist organizations such as the Fronte Nazionale (an offshoot of the Comitato di Liberazione Nazionale), the insurrection was still without central direction, operations being in the hands of local leaders.

In Giuseppe Mazzini Square, a substantial German party reinforced by tanks attacked 50 rebels, killing 12 and injuring more than 15 of them. The workers' quarter of Ponticelli suffered a heavy artillery bombardment after which German units committed several indiscriminate massacres among the population. Other fighting took place near the Capodichino Airport and Piazza Ottocalli, in which three Italian airmen were killed.

In the same hours, at the German headquarters at Corso Vittorio Emanuele, which was repeatedly attacked by insurgents, negotiations were started between Schöll and Stimolo for the return of the Campo Sportivo prisoners in exchange for the free retreat of the Germans from Naples.

30 September
While the German troops had already begun the evacuation of the city before the arrival of Anglo-American forces from Nocera Inferiore, Antonio Tarsia in Curia, a high school teacher, proclaimed himself as head of the rebels and assumed full civil and military powers. Among other things, he issued provisions regarding the precise opening hours for shops and citizens' discipline.

The fighting did not cease, and the German guns in the Capodimonte heights shelled the area between Port'Alba and Piazza Mazzini for the whole day. Other fighting occurred in the area of Porta Capuana.

The fleeing Germans left behind them fires and massacres, including the burning of the State Archives of Naples, which caused great loss of historical information and documents. A few days later there was an explosion at the Palazzo delle Poste, Naples, which was attributed to German explosives.

Liberation of Naples

At 09:30 on 1 October, armoured patrols of the King's Dragoon Guards was the first allied unit to reach Naples, followed by the Royal Scots Greys reinforced by troops of the 82nd Airborne Division. At the end of the day, the German commander-in-chief in Italy—Generalfeldmarschall Albert Kesselring—considered the retreat successfully concluded.

Statistics for the four days of Naples vary: according to some authors, 168 rioters and 159 unarmed citizens were killed according to the postwar ministerial commission for the recognition of partisan victims, casualties amounted to 155, but the registers of the Poggioreale cemetery listed 562 deaths.

In contrast to other resistance episodes in Italy after the 8 September armistice, which also involved Italian fascists, most of the fighting occurred between Italians and Germans. The revolt prevented Germans from organizing resistance in Naples against an Allied offensive and/or destroying the city before a German retreat, as Adolf Hitler had ordered.

On 22 December, Generals Riccardo Pentimalli and Ettore Deltetto, who had abandoned Naples to the Germans after September 8, were sentenced by the High Court of Justice to 20 years in military prison,  for active collaboration with Germans. Domenico Tilena, the head of the fascist provincial section during the riots, was sentenced to six years and eight months.

In popular culture
The historical episode of the Naples rebellion was recalled in Nanni Loy's 1962 film The Four Days of Naples, nominated for Oscars for best foreign film and best screenplay. The final scenes of the film "Tutti a casa" starring Alberto Sordi (1960) also depicted the events, specifically those of September 28.

References

Sources

External links
  Official citation for the Medaglia d'Oro al Valor Militare awarded to Naples
  Article from Patria Indipendente, 31 March 2005
  The "Quattro giornate" on the ANPI site
  The Archivio Storico Municipale in memory of the Quattro Giornate di Napoli

Conflicts in 1943
20th century in Naples
World War II operations and battles of the Italian Campaign
Italian campaign (World War II)
1943 in Italy
Italian resistance movement
Urban warfare